Michael McNamara (1839–1907) was a U.S. Marine who received the Medal of Honor for actions during the Korean Expedition in 1871.

McNamara enlisted in the Marine Corps from Brooklyn in November 1868, and was honorably discharged four years later.

Medal of Honor citation
Rank and organization: Private, U.S. Marine Corps. Born: 1841, Clare, Ireland. Accredited to: New York. G.O. No.: 169, February 8, 1872.

Citation:

While serving on board the U.S.S. Benicia, for gallantry in advancing to the parapet, wrenching the match-lock from the hands of an enemy and killing him, at the capture of the Korean Forts, June 11, 1871.

See also
 , includes photos of  McNamara's new gravestone.
 List of Medal of Honor recipients

Notes

References

 
 

1839 births
1907 deaths
19th-century Irish people
Irish emigrants to the United States (before 1923)
United States Marine Corps Medal of Honor recipients
People from County Clare
United States Marines
Irish-born Medal of Honor recipients
Korean Expedition (1871) recipients of the Medal of Honor
Burials at Holy Name Cemetery (Jersey City, New Jersey)